Leptotrypa is an extinct genus of bryozoans of the family Atactotoechidae that formed unifoliate encrusting colonies, growing on surfaces like the shells of brachiopods.

References

Prehistoric bryozoan genera